The Cameroon Red Cross Society (CRC) was established on 30 April 1960.  It has its headquarters in Yaoundé and is headed by William Eteki Mboumoua.

References

External links
Cameroon Red Cross Society Profile
Official Red Cross Web Site 

Red Cross and Red Crescent national societies
1960 establishments in French Cameroon
Organizations established in 1960
Medical and health organizations based in Cameroon